Reid Farm is a historic home and farm located near Jackson Hill, Davidson County, North Carolina. The main house is a two-story, four bay, vernacular Greek Revival style farmhouse.  Also on the property are a massive threshing barn and a full complement of log and frame outbuildings dating from the mid-19th through the early-20th centuries. The buildings have been moved to Denton Farmpark.

It was added to the National Register of Historic Places in 1979.

References

Farms on the National Register of Historic Places in North Carolina
Greek Revival houses in North Carolina
Houses in Davidson County, North Carolina
National Register of Historic Places in Davidson County, North Carolina